Kuchar is a Slavic language surname. It may refer to:

Kuchař (surname), a version with diacritics
Dennis Kuchar (born 1956), an Australian cardiologist
George Kuchar (1942–2011), an American film director
Matt Kuchar (born 1978), an American professional golfer
Mike Kuchar (born 1942), an American filmmaker and actor
Tadeusz Kuchar (1891–1966), a Polish sportsperson
Theodore Kuchar (born 1963), a Ukrainian-American conductor of classical music
Wacław Kuchar (1897–1981), a Polish sportsperson

Slavic-language surnames